Blue Country is the 13th French studio album by Joe Dassin. It was issued by CBS Records.

The album appeared in 1979 or January 1980. It was the last French album by Joe Dassin released during his lifetime. Performed in collaboration with American singer-songwriter Tony Joe White, Blue Country received an English-language release, the only one of Dassin's career, entitled Home Made Ice Cream.

Track listing, part 1

Track listing, part 2

References

External links 
 

1979 albums
Joe Dassin albums
CBS Disques albums
Albums produced by Jacques Plait